The NRL All Stars team was a rugby league football team made up of professional players in the National Rugby League. These players were selected by fan vote. However, fans were only allowed to select one player from each NRL team to join the Australian rugby league team captain and the New Zealand national rugby league team captain. Two other players were selected by the NRL All Stars coach. This team played in the annual NRL All Stars Game against the Indigenous All Stars. They were replaced in 2016 by a World All Stars.

History
The first NRL All Stars team was assembled in 2010 All Stars Match to play against the Indigenous All Stars on 13 February. After a tight game the Indigenous All Stars won due to a last minute try from Jamie Soward. The final score was 16–12.

During the voting in 2010, the Australian rugby league team and New Zealand national rugby league team vice-captains, Cameron Smith and Adam Blair were selected by default but this rule was dropped the following year. The NRL All Stars were captained by Darren Lockyer in 2010 and 2011. Benji Marshall took over the role in 2012 after Lockyer's retirement. Wayne Bennett's Coach's choice selections in 2011 were Petero Civoniceva and Kurt Gidley and in 2012 were Luke Lewis and Ben Hornby. Ben Hornby was ruled out with injury and Bennett selected Hornby's Dragons teammate Nathan Fien to replace him.

For voting, there are two stages. First fans nominate two forwards and two backs from each club from the NRL to take part in stage 2. For stage 2, the coach selects a position for each of the selected players and it is the fans' job to form a team, with one player from each club only.

Squads

2010

2011

2012

2013

2015

See also

List of NRL All Stars players

References

Rugby league representative teams in Australia
2010 establishments in Australia
NRL All Stars match